The 2016–17 Boston College Eagles men's ice hockey team represented Boston College in the 2016–17 NCAA Division I men's ice hockey season. The team was coached by Jerry York, '67, his twenty-third season behind the bench at Boston College. The Eagles played their home games at Kelley Rink on the campus of Boston College, competing in Hockey East.

The Eagles competed in three tournaments during the 2016–17 season, the first of which took place during the traditional opening of the college hockey season at the 20th annual Ice Breaker Classic. Played on October 7 and 8 at Magness Arena in Denver, Colorado, the tournament showcased the Eagles playing Air Force in the first round, where they would lose a tight 2-1 match. Boston College faced host Denver in the consolation round, picking up a 3-1 victory for their first win of the season. Air Force would defeat Ohio State in the championship. The Eagles had previously won the ice breaker tournament three times; making their fifth appearance this season. The second tournament of the season took place during the holiday break, where the Eagles made the trip to the PPG Paints Arena in Pittsburgh, Pennsylvania for their second appearance in the Three Rivers Classic in its fifth annual year. The Eagles fell 3–1 to the Quinnipiac Bobcats in the opening round, but picked up the 3rd-place result against Ferris State in the consolation round, winning the (unofficial) shootout of the (official) 1–1 tie. Boston College previously won the title in their first appearance at the tournament in 2012. For their final tournament of the season, the Eagles played in the 65th Annual Beanpot Tournament at the TD Garden in Boston, Massachusetts on February 6 and 13. Boston College lost to rival Boston University 3–1 in the opening round (suffering their first season sweep against the Terriers since 1994–95), and were defeated by Northeastern 2–4 in the consolation game, marking the first 4th place finish for the Eagles since 1993 and the first of Jerry York's tenure.

The Eagles finished the season 21–15–5, and 13–6–3 in conference play, earning a share of the regular season title (shared with Boston University and UMass Lowell). They advanced to the Championship of the Hockey East tournament, but would fall to the UMass Lowell River Hawks by a score of 4–3. The Eagles failed to qualify for the NCAA Tournament, having just missed the mark to earn an at-large bid; the Eagles missed out on the tournament for the first time since 2009.

Previous season recap
The Eagles entered the 2016–17 season following the school's record 25th trip to the Frozen Four in Tampa, Florida, where they would fall to Quinnipiac for the second year in the row. Additionally they fell in the semifinals of the Hockey East Tournament to Beanpot rival, Northeastern, who eventually won the title. The Eagles captured two trophies during the 2015–16 season, winning the Beanpot with a 1–0 OT victory over Boston University, and captured a share of the Hockey East regular season title (shared with Providence) off a strong 28–8–5 record and 15–2–5 in conference play.

Departures

Four Senior Eagles graduated in May:
Teddy Doherty – D (Captain)
Travis Jeke – D
Brendan Silk – F
Peter McMullen – F

Doherty and Jeke signed in the offseason with ECHL clubs, the Cincinnati Cyclones and the South Carolina Stingrays, respectively.

Seven Underclassmen left the program early to sign with their respective drafted teams in the NHL:
Ian McCoshen – D (Assistant Captain) – Florida Panthers
Steven Santini – D (Assistant Captain) – New Jersey Devils
Adam Gilmour – F – Minnesota Wild
Thatcher Demko – G – Vancouver Canucks
Alex Tuch – F – Minnesota Wild
Zach Sanford – F – Washington Capitals
Miles Wood – F – New Jersey Devils

Additional:
Josh Couturier left the program and transferred to UMass.
Goalies Chris Birdsall, Alex Joyce, and Charlie van Kula were not retained on the official roster, however they may remain available on emergency basis.

Recruiting
Boston College adds thirteen freshmen for the 2016–17 season: seven forwards, four defensemen, and two goalies.

Mike Booth, F – Recorded 82 points in two seasons playing for the South Shore Kings of the USHL.
Michael Campoli, D – Played alongside incoming Eagles McPhee, Walker and Woll with the US U-18 team.
David Cotton, F – Selected by the Carolina Hurricanes with the 169th overall pick in the 6th round of the 2015 NHL Draft. Scored 30 points playing for the Waterloo Black Hawks of the USHL.
Ryan Edquist, G – Posted a .906 SVG and 3.02 GAA playing for the Madison Capitals of the USHL and was named to the USHL All-Rookie team.
Ron Greco, F – Scored 154 points over three seasons playing for the Philadelphia Junior Flyers of the USPHL, tallying 57 points in his final year and became the team's all-time leader in points scored.
Julius Mattila, F – Scored 56 points in 46 games as he led his team to the Finnish junior league championship and was named second-team All Star. Played for Finland in the 2014–15 U-18 World Junior tournament, winning a silver medal.
Jesper Mattila, D – Playing alongside his twin Julius, Jesper scored 37 points as a defenseman in 46 games, and was named first-team All Star. Also helped win a silver medal for Finland at the 2014–15 U–18 World Juniors.
Luke McInnis, D – Son of assistant coach Marty McInnis, Luke scored 28 points for the Youngstown Phantoms of the USHL last year, getting named to the second All-Rookie team.
Graham McPhee, F – Selected by the Edmonton Oilers with the 149th overall pick in the 5th round of the 2016 NHL Entry Draft. Graham is the son of George McPhee, the general manager for the Vegas Golden Knights. He scored 18 points playing alongside Campoli, Walker and Woll for the US U-18 team and won a bronze medal for the United States at the U-18 World Juniors in 2015–16.
Mike Merulla, F – Scored 55 points in 48 games for the Aston Rebels of the NAHL, leading his team in scoring.
Connor Moore, D – Notched 33 points as a defenseman playing for the Youngstown Phantoms of the USHL.
Zach Walker, F – Played alongside Campoli, McPhee and Woll for the US U-18 team, scoring 13 points and helped secure the bronze medal for the US at the U-18 World Juniors.
Joe Woll, G – Selected by the Toronto Maple Leafs with the 62nd overall pick in the 3rd round of the 2016 NHL Draft. Woll will likely compete for the starting job after Demko's departure. Woll posted a .918 SVG and 2.14 GAA in 33 games for the US U-18 team. He also backstopped the US to a bronze medal at the 2015–16 U-18 World Juniors.

2016–2017 roster

2016–17 Eagles

As of September 13, 2016.

Coaching staff

Standings

Schedule

Regular season 

|-
!colspan=12 style=""| Exhibition

|-
!colspan=12 style=""| Regular Season

|-
!colspan=12 style=""| Hockey East Tournament

Preseason polls ranked the Eagles #5 (USCHO) and #9 (USA Today) nationally, and the Hockey East Coaches Poll ranked Boston College 6th in the conference.
On December 6, five Eagles were named to preliminary rosters of national teams competing at the 2017 World Juniors, three for the United States (D - Casey Fitzgerald, F - Colin White and G - Joe Woll) and two for Finland (D - Jesper Mattila and F - Julius Mattila). All five would survive cuts to their respective final rosters.
During the Eagles trip to Pittsburgh to play in the Three Rivers Classic, the three Eagles representing the United States at the World Juniors won a gold medal after defeating Canada in the championship match in a stunning shootout. Colin White finished the tournament 8th in points scored (8) and 2nd in goals scored (7) while Joe Woll secured two victories for the US in the preliminary round. The Mattila twins would help Finland stave off relegation.
The five competing Eagles rejoined the team on January 8 to play at Frozen Fenway against Providence, which was postponed a day later from the 7th due to snowy conditions. Ryan Fitzgerald also made a comeback after healing from injury and missing the holiday tournament in Pittsburgh. The Eagles would win their 3rd victory at Fenway Park all time with a 3-1 defeat of the Friars.
On February 25, with a Notre Dame loss to Boston University, the Eagles finished in a three way tie for first place in the conference standings at the end of the season, sharing the title of Regular Season Champs with UMass Lowell and Boston University.
The Eagles season came to an end at the Hockey East tournament Championship, where they fell to the River Hawks 4–3. Without an auto-bid into the NCAA tournament, the Eagles would fail to qualify for an at-large bid via the pairwise ranking as the first team out; their first season without competing since 2009. The title game was the 17th appearance for the Eagles and first since 2012.
Several Eagles signed with professional teams in the offseason:
Senior Matthew Guadreau with the Bridgeport Sound Tigers of the AHL on a tryout.
Senior Scott Savage with the Cleveland Monsters of the AHL on a tryout.
Senior Ryan Fitzgerald with his drafted team, the Boston Bruins of the NHL.
Senior Austin Cangelosi with the Albany Devils of the AHL.
Sophomore Colin White with his drafted team, the Ottawa Senators of the NHL.

Rankings

Statistics

Skaters

Goaltenders

Awards and honors

Hockey East Awards
Austin Cangelosi, F - Best Defensive Forward

Hockey East All Stars
Joe Woll, G – All-Rookie Team, Honorable Mention
Scott Savage, D – All-Third Team
Austin Cangelosi, F – All-Third Team

Hockey East All-Tournament Team
Ryan Fitzgerald, Forward
Scott Savage, Defenseman

Hockey East Player of the Week
Austin Cangelosi, F – Week of November 7, 2016, Week of March 13, 2017

Hockey East Rookie of the Week
Joe Woll, G – Week of January 30, 2017

References

External links
BC Men's Hockey Home Page
BC Men's Hockey Page on USCHO

Boston College Eagles men's ice hockey seasons
Boston College Eagles
Boston College Eagles
Boston College Eagles men's ice hockey season
Boston College Eagles men's ice hockey season
Boston College Eagles men's ice hockey season
Boston College Eagles men's ice hockey season